Louis Coolen (born 12 January 1952 in Nuenen) is a Dutch football manager and retired player who works as an advisor to the board at Helmond Sport.

Playing career
During his playing career he played for PSV, Helmond Sport and RKSV Nuenen.

Coaching career
After retiring as a player in 1982, Coolen has managed RKSV Nuenen, Helmondia '55, UDI '19, Helmond Sport and FC Eindhoven. He also was assistant manager at Roda JC for four years.

He moved abroad in September 2008 to become technical director at the Yuri Konoplev Academy in Tolyatti and worked at Russian giants Zenit Saint Petersburg, where he managed their youth coaches in two spells at the club. In between he worked for Roda as technical director and later led the Roda JC academy.

He returned to Helmond Sport in an advisory role in March 2017.

References

External links
 Player profile at Ronald Zwiers

1952 births
Living people
People from Nuenen, Gerwen en Nederwetten
Dutch footballers
Dutch football managers
Helmond Sport managers
FC Eindhoven managers
FC Zenit Saint Petersburg non-playing staff
Dutch expatriate sportspeople in Russia
Association footballers not categorized by position
RKSV Nuenen players
Roda JC Kerkrade non-playing staff
Footballers from North Brabant